The 6 km/7.5 km single mixed relay competition at the Biathlon World Championships 2023 was held on 16 February 2023.

Results
The race was started at 15:10.

References

Single mixed relay